Pobeda may refer to:

Places

Antarctica 
Pobeda Ice Island, an island of Antarctica

Bulgaria 
Pobeda, Dobrich Province
Pobeda, a neighbourhood of Burgas, Burgas Province

Kyrgyzstan 
Peak Pobeda, or Pik Pobedy, a mountain in the Tian Shan mountain range

Kazakhstan 
Pobeda, Kazakhstan, former name of Shalkar village, Karaganda Region

Moldova 
Pobeda, a village in Colosova, Grigoriopol, Transnistria
Pobeda, a village in Lenin, Transnistria

Russia 
Pobeda, Kamennomostskoye, a settlement in Maykopsky District
Pobeda, Leningrad Oblast, a rural locality in Leningrad Oblast
Pobeda, Pobedenskoye, a settlement in Maykopsky District
Pobeda railway station, a station in Moscow Oblast
Pobeda (Samara Metro), a station in Sovetsky district, Samara
Peak Pobeda, Sakha, a mountain in Sakha Republic

Serbia 
Pobeda (Bačka Topola), a village in the Bačka Topola municipality, Vojvodina province, Serbia
Pobeda, part of Radna Zona Istok (Work Zone East), one of the industrial zones in Novi Sad

Other uses
Pobeda (airline), a low-cost airline in Russia
Pobeda (watch), a Russian brand of wrist-watches
1908 Pobeda, a minor planet
FK Pobeda, a football (soccer) team in the Republic of Macedonia
GAZ-M20 Pobeda, a Soviet car
Russian battleship Pobeda, a ship which took part in the Russo-Japanese War (1904–05)
Pobeda 1946, a 2016 novel by Ilmar Taska

See also
"Den Pobedy", a Russian Second World War song
Victory Day (9 May)
Popeda, a Finnish rock band